The 1919 Clemson Tigers football team represented Clemson Agricultural College—now known as Clemson University—as a member of the Southern Intercollegiate Athletic Association (SIAA) during the 1919 college football season. Under third-year head coach Edward Donahue, the team posted an overall record of 6–2–2 with a mark of 3–2–2 in SIAA play.  Stumpy Banks was the team captain.

Schedule

References

Bibliography
 

Clemson
Clemson Tigers football seasons
Clemson Tigers football